Alamo Rent a Car is a rental car agency based in Clayton, Missouri, United States. The company has branches across North America, South America, Africa, Europe, Asia, Australia and Oceania. Alamo is owned by Enterprise Holdings, along with other agencies including Enterprise Rent-A-Car and National Car Rental. Alamo typically caters to budget-conscious leisure travelers and is the largest car rental provider to international travelers visiting North America.

History
Alamo was founded in Florida in 1974. In 1996, Alamo was acquired by Republic Industries (later renamed AutoNation). AutoNation spun off its car rental properties as ANC Rental in 2000. ANC filed for bankruptcy a year later; its properties were sold to Vanguard Automotive Group (controlled by Cerberus Capital Management) in 2003. In 2005, Alamo introduced an online check-in system that allowed customers to submit registration information prior to arrival to bypass counter check-in. In 2007, Alamo’s parent company Vanguard was acquired by Enterprise Holdings, operator of the largest rental car company in North America, which operates the Alamo Rent A Car, Enterprise Rent-A-Car, and National Car Rental brands.

Complaints and criticism
Alamo Rent a Car has been criticized for not providing adequate access to/from terminal buildings to rental car lot for wheelchair users; according to the United States Department of Justice, Alamo was the subject of many such complaints; Alamo reached a settlement with the government regarding the complaints filed by the Department of Justice. There was a report in The Washington Post about problems with customers returning cars after hours; in one instance, a customer returned an undamaged car after hours, but Alamo claimed that it had been rear-ended and demanded an additional $785. Alamo dropped the claim after the renter threatened to take them to court. A report in The Denver Post described a snowbound passenger who was charged $950 per day by Alamo around Christmas time in an instance of apparent price gouging.  A report in USA Today suggested that increases in rental car rates, which averaged 4% in 2013, were leading many rental car users to switch to taking taxis instead. Two automobile safety advocacy groups petitioned the Federal Trade Commission in 2010 to bar Enterprise Holdings, the parent company of Alamo, from renting out recalled vehicles that had not been fixed. Alamo was criticized in The New York Times for failing to provide information about insurance rates for its rental cars on its website.

References

External links 
 

Multinational companies
Companies based in St. Louis County, Missouri
American companies established in 1974
Retail companies established in 1974
Transport companies established in 1974
Enterprise Holdings
1974 establishments in Florida
Car rental companies of the United States